Cora ixtlanensis is a species of basidiolichen in the family Hygrophoraceae. Found in Mexico, it was formally described as a new species in 2019 by Bibiana Moncada, Rosa Emilia Pérez-Pérez, and Robert Lücking. The lichen is only known from the type locality, where it grows terrestrially. The specific epithet refers to the Ixtlán community in Ixtlán de Juárez, who, according to the authors, are "renowned for their sustainable ecosystem management and ecotourism".

References

ixtlanensis
Lichen species
Lichens described in 2019
Lichens of Mexico
Taxa named by Robert Lücking
Basidiolichens